Hangzhou Xiaoshan International Airport  is the principal airport serving Hangzhou, a major city in the Yangtze River Delta region and the capital of Zhejiang Province, China. Architecture firm Aedas designed Hangzhou Xiaoshan International Airport.

The airport has service to destinations throughout China. International destinations are mainly in the east and southeast Asia, and points of Africa, Europe, and South Asia. The airport also serves as a focus city for Air China, China Eastern Airlines, China Southern Airlines, Hainan Airlines and Xiamen Airlines.

In 2017, Hangzhou airport handled 35,570,411 passengers, which ranked tenth in terms of passenger traffic in China. Additionally, the airport ranked sixth busiest in terms of cargo with 589,461.6 tonnes and was the country's ninth busiest airport by traffic movements at 271,066.

On Sep. 8th, 2022, Hangzhou airport put Terminal 4 into operation.

Hangzhou Xiaoshan International Airport has two terminals, Terminal A and Terminal B. The smaller Terminal A serves all international and regional flights while the larger Terminal B solely handles domestic traffic. The airport is located just outside the city in the Xiaoshan District with direct bus service linking the airport with Downtown Hangzhou. The ambitious expansion project will see the addition of a second runway and a third terminal which will dramatically increase capacity of the fast-growing airport that serves as a secondary hub of Air China. A new elevated airport express highway is under construction on top of the existing highway between the airport and downtown Hangzhou. The second phase of Hangzhou Metro Line 1 has a planned extension to the airport.

History
The airport was planned to be constructed in three phases. The first phase of construction started in July 1997, and was completed and opened for traffic on 30 December 2000. It replaced the old Hangzhou Jianqiao Airport, which was a dual-use civil and military airfield. In March 2004, the airport officially became an international airport after immigration and customs facilities were built and put into service. A second runway of 3,600 meters is also under construction. Terminal extensions are also under construction as of 2012.

The airport was a hub of CNAC Zhejiang. After the airlines' merger with Air China, the latter inherited the Hangzhou hub.

KLM launched the first intercontinental air route out of Hangzhou, to Amsterdam, on 8 May 2010.

On the evening of 9 July 2010, the airport was shut down for an hour when an unidentified flying object was detected. Flights were diverted to the nearby airports in Ningbo, Zhejiang and Wuxi, Jiangsu. Eighteen flights were affected. Though normal operations resumed four hours later, the incident captured the attention of the Chinese media and sparked a firestorm of speculation on the UFO's identity.

Facilities

Phase One of the airport occupies  of land. It has a capacity of eight million passengers and 110,000 tons of cargo a year, and can handle aircraft as large as the Boeing 747-400. The passenger terminal can handle 3,600 passengers an hour and is 100,000 square meters in size (including an underground parking of 22,000 square meters). The departure level has 36 ticket counters, including 12 in the international side of the terminal. There are 2,900 seats in the departure lounge. The immigration and customs area occupies 9,500 sq. meter of terminal space.

The apron occupies 340,000 square metres of land, and there are 12 jetways and 18 departure gates.

Maintenance facilities are certified to perform B-Check on all types of aircraft and C-Check on Boeing 737 and Boeing 757 aircraft.

Phase Two of the airport expansion project began construction on 8 November 2007. It included an International Terminal, a second Domestic Terminal, and a new runway. The International Terminal was completed on 3 June 2010. The terminal has 8 air bridgegates, with one gate capable of handling the Airbus A380. All international flights, including flights to Hong Kong, Macau, and Taiwan depart from this terminal. The original terminal handles exclusively domestic flights. All other constructions were completed and operations began on 30 December 2012.

The new domestic terminal (T3) has 90 Check-in desks and 21 Self Check-in counters. It also adds 26 security lanes and 31 aerobridge gates. All public spaces of the terminal have free WIFI services. With the addition of the new passenger terminal, the airport now has a total terminal floor area of 370,000 square metres and will enable the airport to handle 8,520 passengers at peak hour and 32.5 million passengers annually.

Loong Airlines has its headquarters in the Loong Air Office Building on the airport property.

Ground transportation

Airport bus
There are airport bus services linking the airport to points throughout Zhejiang and cities in Jiangsu.

Bus services to/from downtown Hangzhou originate/terminate at the Ticketing Office on Tiyuchang Road with intermediate stops in between.

Rail
Hangzhou Metro Line 1 and Line 7 connect the airport with the city downtown.

Highway
The Airport is accessed by Airport Road, which connects to the Airport Expressway and is linked to downtown Hangzhou by the Xixing Bridge. The Airport Expressway also has an exit at North Shixin Road, which is linked to downtown Xiaoshan. The Shanghai-Hangzhou-Ningbo Expressway has an exit at the airport.

Airlines and destinations

Passenger

Cargo

Accidents and incidents
On 8 January 2022, Tupolev Tu-204-200 RA-64032 of Aviastar-TU was destroyed by fire at the airport.

See also
Hangzhou Jianqiao Airport
List of airports in China
List of the busiest airports in China

References

External links
Official website

Airports in Zhejiang
Buildings and structures in Hangzhou
2000 establishments in China
Airports established in 2000
Xiaoshan District